Jovino Mendoza (born 1941 in Paraguay) is a former footballer. He played for most of his career in Club Rubio Ñú, where he won the 1963 2nd division tournament After his years in Rubio Ñú he was signed by Bolivian side Blooming where he became one of the most emblematic players in the 1960s.

In 1972, at the age of 30, he was asked to take over the managerial role at Rubio Ñú, leading the team to the 1972 second division tournament. That year Mendoza was also in charge of the four categories of youth divisions and took all of them to the title as well.

Titles

As player

As coach

References

Paraguayan footballers
Paraguayan football managers
Living people
1941 births

Association footballers not categorized by position